Leanne Castley (born 1974) is a member of parliament in the Australian Capital Territory Legislative Assembly representing the ACT Liberal Party. Castley was born in the rural NSW town of Gunnedah, however grew up in the Canberra suburb of Charnwood.

At the 2020 Australian Capital Territory general election Castley won one of the five seats in Yerrabi, replacing one of the incumbent Liberals James Milligan.

Castley has worked as a country music singer.

References

External links 

 

1974 births
Living people
Members of the Australian Capital Territory Legislative Assembly
21st-century Australian politicians
Women members of the Australian Capital Territory Legislative Assembly
Liberal Party of Australia members of the Australian Capital Territory Legislative Assembly
21st-century Australian women politicians